The Chicks were a New Zealand singing sibling duo, active in the 1960s. Sisters Judy and Sue Donaldson scored several hits in their native country, including "Miss You Baby", which sounded similar to a song released by Lynne Randell entitled "Ciao Baby". After they split up, Sue launched a successful solo career as Suzanne Lynch, or simply, Suzanne. The Chicks were one of the local New Zealand acts who performed at Redwood 70, the first major modern music festival held in New Zealand in 1970.

On 25 June 2020, the American band formerly known as "the Dixie Chicks" changed their name to The Chicks, dropping the word "Dixie". The band received Judy and Sue's blessings to share the name.

Discography

Studio albums

Awards

Aotearoa Music Awards
The Aotearoa Music Awards (previously known as New Zealand Music Awards (NZMA)) are an annual awards night celebrating excellence in New Zealand music and have been presented annually since 1965.

! 
|-
| 1965 || "Hucklebuck" || Single of the Year ||  ||rowspan="3"| 
|-
| 1968 || "River Deep-Mountain High" || Single of the Year ||  
|-
| 1969 || "Miss You Baby" || Single of the Year ||  
|-
| 2020 || The Chicks || New Zealand Music Hall of Fame ||  || 
|-

References

Sibling musical duos
New Zealand musical duos
Female musical duos
Viking Records artists
Polydor Records artists